GFP may refer to:

Organisations
 Gaelic Football Provence, a French Gaelic Athletic Association club
 Geheime Feldpolizei, the German secret military police during the Second World War
 French Group for the Study of Polymers and their Application, also called French Polymer Group, a French society for the promotion of polymer science

Politics
 GFP Ramdir Sena, a militant Hindu nationalist group in Nepal
 Goa Forward Party, a political party in Goa, India
 Great Fatherland Party, a Russian political party

Science and technology
 Generic Framing Procedure, a multiplexing technique
 Greatest fixed point, in mathematics
 Green fluorescent protein
 Ground-fault protection, an electrical safety device

Other uses
 Generalized first-price auction
 Government-Furnished Property, a term of art for property furnished by the US Federal government to fulfill contract obligations under Federal Acquisition Regulations